A Taste for Death is a 1986 crime novel by the British writer P. D. James, the seventh in the popular Commander Adam Dalgliesh series. The novel won the Silver Dagger in 1986, losing out on the Gold to Ruth Rendell's Live Flesh. It was nominated for a Booker Prize in 1987. The book has been adapted for television and radio.

Plot summary
In the dingy vestry of St. Matthew's Church, Paddington, two bodies have been found with their throats slashed. One is an alcoholic vagrant, whereas the other is Sir Paul Berowne, a baronet and recently resigned government minister. Poet and detective Adam Dalgliesh investigates one of the most convoluted cases of his career.

Title
The title is drawn from a short poem by A. E. Housman:

Reception
In a 1986 book review for The New York Times, Robert B. Parker wrote the book is "graced by one of the most felicitous prose styles I know. Ms. James is simply a wonderful writer." The Sunday Times called it "A cunningly compulsive work... heart-pounding suspense". In a 1986 piece on James by Julian Symons, he notes A Taste for Death "is the longest, most ambitious and the best of Phyllis James's 10 novels."

Adaptations
A television version of the novel was produced for Britain's ITV network in 1988. It starred Roy Marsden as Adam Dalgliesh and Wendy Hiller as Lady Berowne.

Another version with Bertie Carvel as Dalgleish was made as part of the 2021 Channel 5 miniseries Dalgleish, in a much shorter adaptation.

References

External links

1986 British novels
Novels by P. D. James
Novels set in London
Novels about writers
Macavity Award-winning works
British detective novels
Faber and Faber books